Frank Resetarits is a lacrosse player from Hamburg, New York. As a high school player Resitarits ranks in the top three players all-time for points in a career. He played forward for the Buffalo Bandits of the National Lacrosse League and attack for the Long Island Lizards of  Major League Lacrosse. He was drafted fifth overall in the 2007 NLL entry draft by the San Jose Stealth.

In 2012, he served as an assistant lacrosse coach at Notre Dame de Namur University in Belmont, California.

Junior career
Resetarits played junior box lacrosse for the St. Catharines Athletics, a team in Canada that was only an hour away from his hometown across the border. He played there from 2002 to 2006.

College career
Resetarits also played collegiate lacrosse at the University at Albany.  He was co-captain of the Great Danes, alongside Merrick Thomson, and helped lead his team to the NCAA Men's Lacrosse Championship tournament as a senior.

Resetarits was selected, as one of the five finalist for the 2007 Tewaaraton Trophy, awarded to the awarded "Most Outstanding" collegiate lacrosse player in the United States.

Awards
2007—Nike/Inside Lacrosse player of the week honors
2007—USILA 1st Team All-American

Career statistics

University at Albany

[a] 20th in NCAA Division I career goals
__

Major League Lacrosse

__

National Lacrosse League

See also
Albany Great Danes men's lacrosse
NCAA Men's Division I Lacrosse Records

References

Living people
Albany Great Danes men's lacrosse players
American lacrosse players
Buffalo Bandits players
Major League Lacrosse players
People from Hamburg, New York
San Jose Stealth players
Sportspeople from New York (state)
Year of birth missing (living people)